Honda Mobilityland Corp. is a merger of two Japanese racing track facilities, known as the Suzuka Circuit and Mobility Resort Motegi. Suzuka Circuit was established in 1962 and Twin Ring Motegi was established in 1997. The two facilities merged management operations on June 1, 2006, establishing a new business model. It is owned by Honda Motor Co., Ltd.

Businesses
Motorsports
Hold and manage at Suzuka Circuit for Formula One Grand Prix and Mobility Resort Motegi for Grandprix motorcycle racing, 8-hour Endurance Road Race, etc., as well as plan, hold and manage other races.
Amusement
Manage amusement facilities at Suzuka Circuit, Twin Ring Motegi.
Resort
Manage hotels, training halls, restaurants, hot springs and wedding halls.
Traffic Education 
Hold safe riding/driving and licensed motorcycle lessons.
Planning & Development 
Develop and design rides, plan comprehensively the leisure land.

External links
 

Companies based in Mie Prefecture
Entertainment companies established in 1961
Entertainment companies of Japan
Honda
Hospitality companies established in 1961
Hospitality companies of Japan
Japanese companies established in 1961